Llanwern is a community in the eastern part of the City of Newport, South East Wales. Llanwern is bounded by the M4 and Langstone to the north, Ringland, Lliswerry and the River Usk to the west, the River Severn to the south and the city boundary to the east. The population of the Llanwern community in 2011 was 333, which contains Llanwern village and the western half of the site of Llanwern steelworks. The area is governed by the Newport City Council. The community population dropped to 289 in 2011. The community also includes the area of Glan Llyn.

Llanwern House
Llanwern House was the home of Lord Rhondda of Llanwern, David Alfred Thomas, who was Minister of Food during the First World War.

In 1887, a year before his election to Parliament, Thomas took the lease of the house, where he lived the life of a somewhat unconventional country squire, riding to hounds and breeding prize Hereford cattle. He bought the house in 1900 and acquired the neighbouring Pencoed estate shortly before his death, the purchase making Thomas the largest landowner in Monmouthshire after Lord Tredegar.

Despite his fortune Thomas was quite content to retain the mansion at Llanwern, a large square house on a hilltop overlooking the village. The house, dating to 1760, was old-fashioned in its appearance but that appearance concealed a delicate and beautiful interior reflecting Chinese influence.

It was demolished in the 1950s, although the site, on a hill overlooking the parish church, is still visible and the parkland intact. Thomas is buried in the graveyard of the tiny church.

Governance
Llanwern has a community council, represented by up to 7 community councillors.

Llanwern is covered by a Newport City Council electoral ward, also called Llanwern, though also including Goldcliff, Nash, Whitson and Redwick, as well as the community of Llanwern. It elects one city councillor, since 2008 this has been Conservative Martyn Kellway.

Regeneration

A £115m renewal project called Glan Llyn, led by St. Modwen Properties PLC, is transforming the former steel-producing part of the Llanwern steelworks site. Started in 2004, the masterplan envisages 1.5m sq ft (34 acres) of employment-generating accommodation hosting 6,000 jobs, 4,000 new dwellings, community facilities and open space including three new lakes. Full completion is anticipated by 2026–2028.

See also
 Llanwern A.F.C.
 Llanwern High School

References

External links

 Llanwern Church, Monumental Inscriptions
 www.geograph.co.uk : photos of Llanwern and surrounding area
 www.llanwernvillage.org.uk : Information relating to Llanwern Village and Llanwern Community Council

Communities in Newport, Wales